Botrychium boreale, commonly called northern moonwort, is a species of fern in the family Ophioglossaceae. It is a short, single leaved rhizome that stands upright.

References

boreale
Plants described in 1857

Flora of Greenland